Andy Hrovat (born January 21, 1980) is an American wrestler who specializes in freestyle wrestling.  He was a 3-time NCAA All-American and wrestled in the 2008 Olympic Games.

High school career
Hrovat wrestled scholastically at St. Edward High School in Lakewood, Ohio, where he was a two-time OHSAA state champion for coach Greg Urbas.
He graduated from St. Edward in 1998.

College career
Hrovat wrestled at the University of Michigan, with fellow St. Edward wrestling star Ryan Bertin.  He finished with collegiate record of 132–39, among the best in Michigan history.

He achieved NCAA All-American honors three times:
2002: 7th Place
2001: 4th Place
2000: Tournament qualifier
1999: 8th Place

In addition, Big Ten honors include:
2002: 2nd Place
2001: 5th Place
2000: 3rd Place
1999: 7th Place

He graduated from Michigan with a degree in General Studies.

International career

2006 season 
At the 2006 FILA Wrestling World Championships, he finished in 18th place.

2007 season 
Hrovat earned a silver medal at the 2007 Pan American Games.

2008 season

Qualification tournaments 
He came in 2nd in the 2008 national tournament, losing to Mo Lawal.  He avenged the loss to Mo Lawal to make the Olympic Team.

2008 Olympics 
Wrestling in the 84 kg weight class - freestyle, Hrovat drew a bye in the round of 16.  He wrestled Cuba's Reineris Salas Perez in the round of 8, losing 3-0 1-3 2-2.  The Cuban's loss to the Turkish wrestler Serhat Balcı in the quarterfinal round eliminated Hrovat from further competition in the repechage round.

2009 season 
Hrovat wrestled for New York Athletic Club.  Following the 2009 World Team Trials, he was ranked second in the 96 kg/211.5 lbs weight class.

2011 season 
In June 2011, Andy announced his retirement from wrestling.

Andy then joined the Cliff Keen Wrestling Club as a coach.

References 

1980 births
Living people
Sportspeople from Lakewood, Ohio
St. Edward High School (Lakewood, Ohio) alumni
American people of Slovenian descent
Wrestlers at the 2007 Pan American Games
Wrestlers at the 2008 Summer Olympics
Olympic wrestlers of the United States
Michigan Wolverines wrestlers
American male sport wrestlers
Pan American Games silver medalists for the United States
Pan American Games medalists in wrestling
Medalists at the 2007 Pan American Games